Leigh Scott Adams (born 28 April 1971 in Mildura, Victoria) is a former motorcycle speedway rider from Australia. He is a multiple Speedway Grand Prix winner and World Team Champion. He also won a record 10 Australian Solo Championships, four Australian Under-21 Championships, the 1992 Individual Speedway Junior World Championship, and was the 1986 Australian Under-16 Champion.

Career

Australia
Leigh Adams was a product of junior speedway in his home town of Mildura, which was also the home town of multiple Victorian and Australian champion Phil Crump who became his mentor. Adams started racing in 1979 and within a few years would prove himself as one of Australia's best junior solo riders. He finished 3rd in the 1983 Australian U/16 Championship at his home track, the Olympic Park Speedway, before finishing second to Adelaide rider Shane Parker in the 1985 Championship at the Sidewinders Speedway in Adelaide. Adams won the Australian Under-16 championship in 1986 at the age of 15 which was held in Mildura, before joining the senior ranks in 1987.

Adams would win the first of four Australian Under-21 Championships in 1988 at North Arm in Adelaide, before going on to win again in 1990 at the Riverland Speedway in Renmark, 1991 at Olympic Park and 1992 at the Riverview Speedway in Murray Bridge. He only missed out in 1989 (held in Mildura) after being excluded from his first race, though he eventually went on to finish on the podium in 3rd place behind Adelaide's Craig Hodgson (1st) and Scott Norman (2nd).

Adams won the Australian Solo Championship in 1992 (North Arm), 1993 (Brisbane Exhibition Ground), 1994 (Olympic Park), 1998 (Murray Bridge), 2000 (Gosford), 2002 (Wayville Showground, Adelaide), 2003 (Gosford), 2005, 2006 and finally 2009. He won his first national title at the North Arm Speedway in Adelaide with a 14 points from his 5 rides (beaten only by title runner-up Shane Parker in their second race), and his tenth and last championship also in Adelaide at Gillman Speedway after dominating the three-round championship with 15 wins from 15 rides. Adams won his first 7 Australian titles under the traditional single meeting format which lasted until his 2003 win. From 2004 the championship became a series held over 3, 4 or 5 rounds.

Adams won his first Victorian State Championship in 1989 in Mildura in what was only his third season of senior riding, beating 13 time and defending champion Phil Crump at Olympic Park. In the early days of his career, and the last of Crump's which had begun in 1970, Crump and Adams were known as "The Master and the Apprentice". Adams would also win the Victorian title in 1990 (Myrtleford), 1991 and 1992 (Mildura), 1994 (Undera) and 1995 (Mildura).

While the reigning Australian U/21 and Senior Champion in 1992, Adams went on to win the 1992 Under-21 World Championship at Pfaffenhofen an der Ilm in Germany to become the Australia's first U/21 World Champion since Adelaide's Steve Baker in 1983.

In 1997 and 1998, Adams won the 10 Round Australian Speedway Masters Series (also known as the "Series 500") against riders such as Jason Crump, Todd Wiltshire, Ryan Sullivan, Simon Wigg, Sam Ermolenko, Tony Rickardsson and Greg Hancock. He finished runner up in the series to Jason Crump in 1999, and the final year the series was run in 2000 he was once again the Series 500 champion, easily winning the point score over Wiltshire and 1996 World Champion Billy Hamill.

1999 also saw Adams win the Australian Long Track Championship in Port Pirie, South Australia, making him the only rider to have won the Australian U/16 (plus Pairs), U/21, Senior (plus Pairs) and Long Track championships. Adams holds the record for most Australian Solo Championship wins with 10 and jointly holds the record for most Australian Under-21 Championship wins with 2012 World Champion Chris Holder. Both riders won the junior title on four occasions.

International
Leigh first came to England in 1988 and completed four matches for Poole in the National Junior League. Adams had originally been recommended to Poole by their Australian team manager Neil Street (the father-in-law of Phil Crump), and it was Poole he subsequently joined for their National League Championship winning season of 1989, when he rode alongside riders such as Craig Boyce and Alun Rossiter.

To further his career, Leigh then moved up a league to join Swindon for the 1990 season. He made his Robins’ debut when scoring 8+2 points from six rides against Oxford in a Gold Cup match at Blunsdon on 24 March. Adams won the first of his record ten Australian national titles in 1992, and also captured the World Under-21 Championship after beating Mark Loram in a race-off at Pfaffenhofen an der Ilm, Germany. With Swindon relegated to the British League Division Two after the 1992 season, Leigh moved on to spend three years with Arena Essex (1993–95)

In October 1995, during the Speedway Grand Prix Qualification he won the GP Challenge, which ensured that he claimed a permanent slot for the 1996 Grand Prix. He repeated the success two years later in 1997.

He had a single season with the London Lions in 1996 before returning to Swindon in 1997 and recorded a 9.96 average in the inaugural season of the Elite League. Adams was again back with the Robins in 1998 but with Swindon again dropping down a league in 1999, he left and signed for the King's Lynn Stars. Adams remained at King's Lynn for the 2000 campaign and topped the Elite League riders averages, finishing the season on 10.24.

In 2001, Adams signed for Oxford and won the Elite League Championship. He remained with Oxford in 2002 and the 2003 season saw Adams register a 9.97 league average back with Poole in a year which the Pirates won the treble; winning the League Championship, the Knock-Out Cup and the British League Cup. The year also saw him awarded a testimonial, which took place at Swindon.

Adams returned to Swindon in 2004 and again finished top of the Elite League averages on 10.94 and partnered Charlie Gjedde to victory in the Elite League Pairs Championship. In 2005, Adams partnered new Swindon signing Lee Richardson to the Elite League Pairs Championship at Peterborough. On the world stage, Leigh ended his tenth season of Grand Prix activity with his highest ever ranking by winning the bronze medal after being the World No. 4 for the previous three years.

Adams put together another successful season for Swindon in 2007, as the club finished runners-up in all three major domestic finals, being beaten by Coventry in the Elite League Play-Offs final, Knock-Out Cup final and Craven Shield final. Adams completed his best ever Grand Prix campaign in 2007, finishing second overall to Nicki Pedersen. In a consistent Grand Prix campaign, he took victory in three rounds and completed the series with 153 points. In 2008 Adams became the Swindon Robins all-time top points scorer. His paid maximum at Lakeside in August 2008 took him onto 5,482.5 points, surpassing the previous record set by Martin Ashby who scored 5,476.5 during his time with the Robins.

Retirement
In 2010 Leigh Adams announced his retirement from speedway after 20 years of international competition which saw him win 10 Australian Solo championships, 4 Australian Under-21 Championships as well as the World Under-21 Championship in 1992. This along with a junior career which started in 1982 and saw him win the Australian and Victorian Under-16 Championships. He also finished a career best second in the 2007 Speedway Grand Prix behind Denmark's Nicki Pedersen after finishing third in 2005.

In 2011, and now with the time do so, Adams fulfilled a long-term ambition and entered the Finke Desert Race in Australia's Northern Territory near Alice Springs. On 6 June, while on a training ride with his brother and other riders, Adams crashed his motorbike into rocky terrain and sustained multiple injuries including fractured vertebrae, extensive spinal cord damage and broken ribs. He was flown from Alice Springs to Royal Adelaide Hospital where he underwent a six-hour operation to stabilise and strengthen his badly injured spine.

In 2012–13, Adams provided television commentary for Australia's World Series Sprintcars series.

In 2014, Adams' son Declyn finished 3rd in the Australian Under-16 Championship at the Pinjar Park Speedway in Perth, Western Australia, emulating his father's first Australian U/16 podium finish in 1983 in Mildura.

Career honours
 1986 Australian Under-16 Champion, Australian Under-16 Pairs Champion
 1988 Australian Under-21 Champion
 1989 Victorian State Champion
 1990 Australian Under-21 Champion & Victorian State Champion
 1991 Australian Under-21 Champion & Victorian State Champion
 1992 World Under-21 Champion, Australian Champion, Australian Pairs Champion, Australian Under-21 Champion (record 4th Australian U/21 Championship) & Victorian State Champion
 1993 Australian Champion
 1993 Commonwealth Champion
 1994 Australian Champion
 1994 Jack Young Memorial Cup winner & Victorian State Champion
 1995 GP Challenge winner & Victorian State Champion
 1996 Edward Jancarz Memorial winner
 1997 Jack Young Memorial Cup winner
 1997 Australian Masters Series 500 Champion
 1998 Australian Masters Series 500 Champion
 1998 Australian Champion & GP Challenge winner
 1999 World Team Cup Champion, Australian Long Track Champion & Golden Helmet of Pardubice winner. For this feat, he was award the Australian Sports Medal in 2000.
 2000 Australian Champion, Australian Masters Series 500 Champion, Golden Helmet of Pardubice & Alfred Smoczyk Memorial winner
 2001 World Cup Champion, British Elite League (Oxford), Golden Helmet of Pardubice & Jack Young Solo Cup winner
 2002 World Cup Champion, Australian Champion, Scandinavian GP & Jack Young Solo Cup winner
 2003 Australian Champion, British Elite League, KO Cup, British League Cup (Poole), Slovenian GP & Jack Young Solo Cup winner
 2004 Golden Helmet of Pardubice, British Elite League Best Pairs & Swedish GP
 2005 Australian Champion, British Elite League Best Pairs
 2006 Australian Champion
 2007 Swedish GP, Scandinavian GP & Latvian GP winner
 2008 European GP, Scandinavian GP & Alfred Smoczyk Memorial winner
 2009 Australian Champion (record 10th Australian Championship) & Elite League Riders' Champion

World Final Appearances

Individual World Championship
 1993 -  Pocking, Rottalstadion - 15th - 4pts

World Pairs Championship
 1990 -  Landshut, Ellermühle Stadium (with Todd Wiltshire) - 2nd - 41pts (16)
 1992 -  Lonigo, Pista Speedway (with Craig Boyce / Shane Parker) - 7th - 10pts (4)
 1993 -  Vojens, Speedway Center (with Craig Boyce / Jason Lyons) - 6th - 13pts (7)

World Team Cup
 1994 -  Brokstedt, Holsteinring Brokstedt (with Craig Boyce) - 4th - 17pts (7)
 1995 -  Bydgoszcz, Polonia Bydgoszcz Stadium (with Jason Crump / Craig Boyce) - 5th - 14pts (0)
 1999 -  Pardubice, Svítkova Stadion (with Jason Crump / Ryan Sullivan / Jason Lyons / Todd Wiltshire) - Winner - 40pts (14)
 2000 -  Coventry, Brandon Stadium (with Jason Crump / Ryan Sullivan / Todd Wiltshire / Craig Boyce) - 4th - 29pts (12)

World Cup
 2001 -  Wrocław, Olympic Stadium (with Jason Crump / Todd Wiltshire / Craig Boyce / Ryan Sullivan) - Winner - 68pts (16)
 2002 -  Peterborough, East of England Showground (with Todd Wiltshire / Jason Lyons / Jason Crump / Ryan Sullivan) - Winner - 64pts (17)
 2003 -  Vojens, Speedway Center (with Jason Crump / Todd Wiltshire / Jason Lyons / Ryan Sullivan) - 2nd - 57pts (15)
 2006 -  Reading, Smallmead Stadium (with Travis McGowan / Ryan Sullivan / Todd Wiltshire / Jason Crump) - 4th - 35pts (8)
 2007 -  Leszno, Alfred Smoczyk Stadium (with Ryan Sullivan / Jason Crump / Chris Holder / Davey Watt / Rory Schlein) - 3rd - 29pts (5)
 2008 -  Vojens, Speedway Center (with Chris Holder / Jason Crump / Ryan Sullivan / Davey Watt) - 4th - 21pts (6)
 2009 -  Leszno, Alfred Smoczyk Stadium (with Davey Watt / Troy Batchelor / Chris Holder / Jason Crump) - 2nd - 43pts (12)

Individual Under-21 World Championship
 1989 -  Lonigo, Pista Speedway - 7th - 9pts
 1992 -  Pfaffenhofen an der Ilm, Speedway Stadion Pfaffenhofen - Winner - 14+3pts

Speedway Grand Prix results

See also
 Australia national speedway team

References

External links
 Speedway GP rider profile
 Leigh Adams Official Website

1971 births
Living people
Australian speedway riders
Speedway World Cup champions
People from Mildura
Poole Pirates riders
Swindon Robins riders
King's Lynn Stars riders
Recipients of the Australian Sports Medal
Oxford Cheetahs riders